Juan Pardo is the name of:
Juan Pardo (explorer), 16th-century Spanish explorer and conquistador
Juan Pardo de Tavera (1472–1545), Spanish cardinal and Grand Inquisitor
Juan Pardo (musician) (1942–), Spanish singer and songwriter